New York's 2nd State Senate district is one of 63 districts in the New York State Senate. Since 2021, it has been represented by Republican Mario Mattera, who succeeded former Senate Majority Leader John Flanagan.

Geography
2nd District covers north-central Suffolk County on Long Island, including the town of Smithtown, as well as portions of Brookhaven and Huntington.

The district overlaps with New York's 1st and 3rd congressional districts, and with the 3rd, 4th, 5th, 8th, 10th, and 12th districts of the New York State Assembly.

Recent election results

2020

2018

2016

2014

2012

Federal results in District 2

References

02